The Northampton County Courthouse Historic District is a nine-acre historic district in Northampton County, Virginia. The district is listed on the National Register of Historic Places. Three buildings are located on the property: A courthouse and a clerk's office (both dating to 1731), and a prison (dating to 1814). The buildings house documents dating back to 1632.  It is included in the Eastville Historic District.

History
The courthouse was constructed by John Marshall, a Founding Father of the United States, in 1731 at the cost of 50,000 pounds of tobacco. Built in Flemish bond style, the brick building measured approximately 35 feet by 23 feet. The Clerk's Office was built adjacent to the courthouse. It features diagonally-battened door fastens and an unusual assortment of variously sized paving stones.

The building remained in use through 1795, when another courthouse was constructed nearby.  It was then turned into a storehouse for a rent of $1 per year, on the condition that the new lessee would fund a new roof for the building.

Preservation
The court house remained in the possession of the original lessee and his descendants until it was purchased by the county in 1913 for $4,000.  Preservation Virginia had the building moved to its current location, near the Clerk's Office.  Using funds from the County of Northampton, the local Preservation Virginia Branch, and a grant from the parent Preservation Virginia, the 1731 Courthouse, Clerk's Office, and the Debtor's Prison underwent extensive repair in the 1950s.

The buildings are owned by the County of Northampton, Virginia.  The Northampton Historic Preservation Society (formerly the Northampton Branch of Preservation Virginia) works as an advocate with County Supervisors and personnel to maintain the preservation of the entire Eastville Court Green and its buildings.  The courthouse includes a museum, which along with the three buildings is open daily during regular business hours from April through October.

The Eastville Court Green is listed on the National Register of Historic Places (2009) and the Virginia Landmarks Register (2009).

References

External links
 Properties and Exhibits in Northampton County - Northampton Historic Preservation Society
Courthouse Group Area Survey, U.S. Route 13, Eastville, Northampton County, VA at the Historic American Buildings Survey (HABS)

Federal architecture in Virginia
Romanesque Revival architecture in Virginia
Historic districts in Northampton County, Virginia
County courthouses in Virginia
Courthouses on the National Register of Historic Places in Virginia
National Register of Historic Places in Northampton County, Virginia
Historic American Buildings Survey in Virginia
Individually listed contributing properties to historic districts on the National Register in Virginia
Museums in Northampton County, Virginia
History museums in Virginia
Historic districts on the National Register of Historic Places in Virginia